Psoriasin may refer to:

 Coal tar, by-product of the production of coke and coal gas from coal.
 S100A7, S100 calcium-binding protein A7.